Neocalyptis fortis is a moth of the family Tortricidae. It is found in Vietnam.

The ground colour of the forewings is creamish. The dots are sparse and brownish. The markings are pale grey-brown with darker marginal dots. The hindwings are brownish cream, transparent with brownish venation.

Etymology
The specific name refers to the strong labis and is derived from Latin fortis (meaning strong).

References

Moths described in 2009
Neocalyptis
Moths of Asia
Taxa named by Józef Razowski